The 13th Lambda Literary Awards were held in 2001 to honour works of LGBT literature published in 2000.

Special awards

Nominees and winners

External links
 13th Lambda Literary Awards

Lambda Literary Awards
Lambda
Lists of LGBT-related award winners and nominees
2001 in LGBT history
2013 awards in the United States